Dysgonomonas is a Gram-negative and facultatively anaerobic genus from the family of Dysgonomonadaceae which have been isolated from human sources. Dysgonomonas bacteria can cause gastroenteritis in immunocompromised persons

References

Further reading 
 
 
 
 
 
 

Bacteroidia
Bacteria genera